Daviesia inflata is a species of flowering plant in the family Fabaceae and is endemic to the south-west of Western Australia. It is an erect shrub with many spreading stems, scattered needle-shaped, sharply-pointed phyllodes and orange red flowers with a dark red centre.

Description

Taxonomy and naming
Daviesia inflata was first formally described in 1984 by Michael Crisp in the journal Nuytsia from specimens collected near Augusta by W.R. Barker in 1977. The specific epithet (inflata) means "bladdery", referring to the immature fruit.

Distribution and habitat
This daviesia grows in swampy or winter-wet areas in heath or forest and occurs in near-coastal areas between Harvey and Augusta in the Jarrah Forest, Mallee, Swan Coastal Plain and Warren biogeographic regions of south-western Western Australia.

Conservation status
Daviesia inflata is listed as "not threatened" by the Department of Biodiversity, Conservation and Attractions.

References

inflata
Eudicots of Western Australia
Plants described in 1984
Taxa named by Michael Crisp